The 2018–19 Saudi Professional League was the 44th edition of the Saudi Professional League, the top Saudi professional league for association football clubs, since its establishment in 1975. The season started on 30 August 2018 and concluded on 16 May 2019.

Al-Hilal were the defending champions after winning the Pro League last season for the 15th time. Al-Wehda and Al-Hazem have entered as the promoted teams from the 2017–18 Prince Mohammad bin Salman League. Al-Nassr were crowned as league winners for the 8th time on 16 May, after defeating Al-Batin 2–1 on the final day of the season.

Ohod were the first team to be relegated after a 3–1 defeat to Al-Fayha on 12 April 2019. Al-Batin were the second team to be relegated following their 1–0 defeat to an already relegated Ohod. Al-Qadsiah were the third and final team to be relegated after a draw against Al-Hazem on the final day of the season.

Abderrazak Hamdallah was the top scorer with 34 goals, and was also named Player of the Season. He also set the record for most goals in a single season. Pedro Emanuel of Al-Taawoun won the Manager of the Season award.

Changes
On 7 March 2018, the Saudi FF announced that the league would be increased from 14 teams to 16 teams. They also announced new rules limiting the club's squad size to 28 players.

Teams

Sixteen teams will compete in the league – the top twelve teams from the previous season, the two play-off winners and two teams promoted from the Prince Mohammad bin Salman League.

Teams who were promoted to the Pro League

The first club to be promoted was Al-Wehda, following their 2–2 draw away to Al-Mujazzal on 11 April 2018. Al-Wehda will play in the top flight of Saudi football after a seasons absence. They were crowned champions on 18 April 2018 after beating Al-Khaleej 1–0 at home.

The second club to be promoted was Al-Hazem, following their 4–1 win at home against Al-Mujazzal on 18 April 2017, coupled with Al-Tai's defeat against Hajer. Al-Hazem will play in the top flight of Saudi football for the first time since 2010–11.

Teams who were relegated to the MS League

No teams were relegated to the Prince Mohammad bin Salman League. Due to an increase in the number of teams, the Saudi FF announced that the relegation was canceled and in its place was a relegation play-off. Both Pro League teams, Al-Raed and Ohod, won the playoffs and secured their top-flight status.

Stadiums
Note: Table lists in alphabetical order.

1:  Al-Faisaly play their home games in Al-Majma'ah. 
2:  Al-Hilal, Al-Nassr and Al-Shabab also use Prince Faisal bin Fahd Stadium (22,500 seats) as a home stadium.
3:  Al-Hilal also use King Fahd International Stadium (62,685 seats) as a home stadium.

Personnel and kits 

 1 On the back of the strip.
 2 On the right sleeve of the strip.
 3 On the shorts.

Managerial changes

Foreign players
The number of foreign players is limited to 7 per team. On June 7, 2018, the Saudi FF increased the number of foreign players from 7 to 8 players.

Players name in bold indicates the player is registered during the mid-season transfer window.

{| class="wikitable" border="1" style="text-align: left; font-size:90%"
|-
! width="120" | Club
! width="220" | Player 1
! width="220" | Player 2
! width="220" | Player 3
! width="220" | Player 4
! width="220" | Player 5
! width="220" | Player 6
! width="220" | Player 7
! width="220" | Player 8
! width="240" | Former Players
|-
| Al-Ahli
|  Aderlan Santos
|  Djaniny
|  Claudio Baeza
|  Paulo Díaz
|  Mohamed Abdel Shafy
|  Nicolae Stanciu
|  Omar Al Somah
| —
|  Souza  Abdallah El Said Alexis José Manuel Jurado
|-
| Al-Batin
|  Osama Malik
|  Adriano Facchini
|  Baraka
|  Crysan
|  Jhonnattann
|  Lucas Tagliapietra
|  Ismaël Bangoura
|  Zied Ounalli
|  João Gabriel  Johan Arango Misael Riascos Aziz Bouhaddouz
|-
| Al-Ettifaq
|  Raïs M'Bolhi
|  Cristian Guanca
|  Hussein El Sayed
|  Filip Kiss
|  Ahmed Akaïchi
|  Fakhreddine Ben Youssef
|  Brahian Alemán
|  Ramón Arias
|  Farley Rosa
|-
| Al-Faisaly
|  Denílson
|  Igor Rossi
|  Luisinho
|  Rogerinho
|  Diego Calderón
|  Ante Puljić
|  Fahad Al Ansari
|  Khaleem Hyland
|  Joseph Akpala
|-
| Al-Fateh
|  Ibrahim Chenihi
|  Mohamed Naâmani
|  Nikita Korzun
|  João Pedro
|  Saša Jovanović
|  Abdelkader Oueslati
|  Maksym Koval
|  Matías Aguirregaray
|  Nzuzi Toko  Alkhaly Bangoura
|-
| Al-Fayha
|  Iury
|  Gegé
|  Danilo Asprilla
|  Alexandros Tziolis
|  Amer Shafi
|  Nahir Besara
|  Rami Bedoui
|  Amine Chermiti
|  Jonathan Gómez  Naldo Ronnie Fernández  Cristian Bonilla John Jairo Ruiz Seidu Yahaya
|-
| Al-Hazem
|  Malik Asselah
|  Alemão
|  Muralha
|  Rodolfo
|  Jhon Pajoy
|  Zurab Tsiskaridze
|  Kennedy Igboananike
|  Diogo Salomão
|  Gilbert Álvarez  Carlos Feraud Youssef Kalfa
|-
| Al-Hilal
|  Milos Degenek
|  Carlos Eduardo
|  Bafétimbi Gomis
|  Sebastian Giovinco
|  Ali Al-Habsi
|  André Carrillo
|  Alberto Botía
|  Jonathan Soriano
|  Omar Abdulrahman  Achraf Bencharki Omar Kharbin  Gelmin Rivas
|-
| Al-Ittihad
|  Jonas
|  Romarinho
|  Garry Rodrigues
|  Carlos Villanueva
|  Sékou Sanogo
|  Karim El Ahmadi
|  Manuel da Costa
|  Aleksandar Prijović
|  Matthew Jurman Marcelo Grohe  Thiago Carleto Valdívia  Aleksandar Pešić
|-
| Al-Nassr
|  Brad Jones
|  Bruno Uvini
|  Giuliano
|  Maicon
|  Petros
|  Abderrazak Hamdallah
|  Nordin Amrabat
|  Ahmed Musa
|  Christian Ramos
|-
| Al-Qadsiah
|  Mokhtar Belkhiter
|  Jack Duncan
|  Rhys Williams
|  Bismark
|  Élton
|  Jorge Silva
|  Mohammed Fatau
|  Youssef Kalfa
|  Jorginho  Yago Santos Aboubakar Oumarou  Hervé Guy
|-
| Al-Raed
|  Azzedine Doukha
|  Hicham Belkaroui
|  Ilombe Mboyo
|  Daniel Amora
|  Kanu
|  Mohamed Atwa
|  Ferhan Hasani
|  Ahmed Hammoudan
|  Yassine El Ghanassy  Ismaël Bangoura
|-
| Al-Shabab
|  Djamel Benlamri
|  Luiz Antônio
|  Sebá
|  Bubacarr Trawally
|  Mbark Boussoufa
|  Constantin Budescu
|  Valerică Găman
|  Farouk Ben Mustapha
|  Arthur Caíke Euller Silva  Somália
|-
| Al-Taawoun
|  Cássio
|  Nildo Petrolina
|  Sandro Manoel
|  Cédric Amissi
|  Léandre Tawamba
|  Héldon Ramos
|  Ricardo Machado
|  Jehad Al-Hussain
|  Jhonnattann
|-
| Al-Wehda
|  Zidane Mebarakou
|  Anselmo
|  Marcos Guilherme
|  Renato Chaves
|  Kabongo Kasongo
|  Mohamed Awad
|  Issam Jebali
|  Rómulo Otero
|  Fernandão Emre Çolak
|-
| Ohod
|  Carl Medjani
|  Adolphe Teikeu
|  Ignatiy Nesterov
|  Mohamed Fouzair
|  Moussa Maâzou
|  Tamer Haj Mohamad
|  Ghazi Abderrazzak
|  Aymen Belaïd
|  Enes Sipović  Apodi Bruno Michel  Ribamar Ahmed Gomaa Moamen Zakaria Carlos Ohene'' Zouhair Laaroubi|-
|}

League table

Positions by round
The following table lists the positions of teams after each week of matches. In order to preserve the chronological evolution, any postponed matches are not included to the round at which they were originally scheduled but added to the full round they were played immediately afterward. If a club from the Saudi Professional League wins the King Cup, they will qualify for the AFC Champions League, unless they have already qualified for it through their league position. In this case, an additional AFC Champions League group stage berth will be given to the 3rd placed team, and the AFC Champions League play-off round spot will be given to 4th.

Results

Season progress

Relegation play-offs
The 13th place team in the Saudi Professional League, Al-Hazem, will face the 4th place team in the MS League, Al-Khaleej, over two legs on a home-and-away basis.All times are AST (UTC+3).''

First leg

Second leg

 Season statistics 
 Scoring 

Top scorers

 Hat-tricks 

Note
(H) – Home; (A) – Away4 Player scored 4 goals; 5 Player scored 5 goals

Most assists

 Clean sheets 

 Discipline 

 Player 

 Most yellow cards: 11 Saeed Al-Rubaie (Al-Ettifaq)

 Most red cards: 2 Hassan Muath (Al-Shabab)
 Paulo Díaz (Al-Ahli)
 Brahian Alemán (Al-Ettifaq)
 Masoud Bakheet (Al-Hazem)

 Club 

 Most yellow cards: 82 Al-Ettifaq

 Most red cards: 7'''
 Al-Hilal

Attendances

By team

†

†

Awards

Monthly awards

Round awards

Annual awards

See also
 2018–19 Prince Mohammad bin Salman League
 2018–19 Second Division
 2019 King Cup
 2018 Super Cup

References

Saudi Professional League seasons
Saudi Professional League
1